In mathematics, a complete set of invariants for a classification problem is a collection of maps

In words, such that two objects are equivalent if and only if all invariants are equal.

Symbolically, a complete set of invariants is a collection of maps such that

is injective.

As invariants are, by definition, equal on equivalent objects, equality of invariants is a necessary condition for equivalence; a complete set of invariants is a set such that equality of these is also sufficient for equivalence. In the context of a group action, this may be stated as: invariants are functions of coinvariants (equivalence classes, orbits), and a complete set of invariants characterizes the coinvariants (is a set of defining equations for the coinvariants).

Examples
 In the classification of two-dimensional closed manifolds, Euler characteristic (or genus) and orientability are a complete set of invariants.
 Jordan normal form of a matrix is a complete invariant for matrices up to conjugation, but eigenvalues (with multiplicities) are not.

Realizability of invariants
A complete set of invariants does not immediately yield a classification theorem: not all combinations of invariants may be realized. Symbolically, one must also determine the image of

References

Mathematical terminology